The Investigators may refer to:

Television shows 
 The Investigators (Australian TV series), a 1985–1995 Australian consumer affairs programme
 The Investigators (Irish TV series), a 2007–2008 Irish science programme broadcast on RTÉ One
 The Investigators (British TV series), a 1999 British children's television programme broadcast on Channel 4
 The Investigators (1961 TV series), a 1961 American dramatic television series broadcast on CBS
 The Investigators, a 1984 HBO TV series starring Charles Rocket

Other 
 The Investigators (band), a Lovers rock group from London